David Farrell may refer to:
 David Farrell (footballer, born 1969), Scottish-born football defender for Hibernian and Partick Thistle
 David Farrell (footballer, born 1971), English-born football midfielder for Peterborough United
 David Farrell (Gaelic footballer)
 David Farrell (judge) (born 1956), British judge
 David Farrell (political scientist) (born 1960)
 David Farrell (politician) (1891–1953), member of the Queensland Legislative Assembly
 Dave Farrell, bassist of American rock band Linkin Park